Kei were a South African first-class cricket team based in the Eastern Cape city of Mthatha.

Playing history
When Cricket South Africa decided to expand the Provincial Three-Day Challenge in 2006, Kei were one of five provincial teams (along with KwaZulu-Natal Inland, Limpopo, Mpumalanga and South Western Districts) elevated to first-class status.

Kei played seven first-class matches in the 2006–07 season, losing them all by large margins, five of them by an innings. They also lost all six of their matches in the Provincial One-Day Challenge by large margins. None of their matches were played on their home ground in Mthatha.

Their most successful batsman in the first-class matches was Sivuyile Duda, who scored 265 runs at an average of 18.92 including the team's only century, 102 against KwaZulu-Natal Inland. Keeping wicket, Duda also made four catches and a stumping in that match, and finished the season with 12 catches and two stumpings. He played one match for KwaZulu-Natal Inland in 2007–08.

In a competition that was itself of borderline first-class status, Cricket South Africa considered Kei's performance (and those of Limpopo and Mpumalanga) too weak to justify their place, and after one season, all three teams were omitted. They have played no further first-class cricket.

Since 2010–11 Kei have competed in the Cricket South Africa Rural League, coastal division, a 50-over competition.

Lists of players

First-class
Kei played seven matches at first-class level, all during the 2006–07 season of the South African Airways Provincial Challenge. The team used 18 players during this period, three of whom (Sivuyile Duda, Mdngezi Nabe, and Junior Yoli) played in each match.

References

External links
 Lists of matches played by Kei at CricketArchive

Further reading
 South African Cricket Annual – various editions
 Wisden Cricketers' Almanack – various editions

Former senior cricket clubs in South Africa
South African first-class cricket teams
Sport in the Eastern Cape